Albert Raymond "Abet" Sandejas Garcia (born February 1, 1970) is a Filipino politician. He currently serves as a member of the Philippine House of Representatives representing the 2nd District of Bataan since 2022. He served as the 24th provincial Governor of Bataan from 2013 to 2022 under the National Unity Party, which also he is the president of the political party. He has previously been elected to two terms as a Member of the House of Representatives, representing the 2nd District of Bataan. He first won election to Congress in 2004 and was re-elected in 2007. Prior to his election to Congress, Garcia served two terms as mayor of Balanga from 1998 to 2004.

See also
 Tau Gamma Phi

References
 

Notes

External links
 

|-

|-

|-

1970 births
Living people
Governors of Bataan
Members of the House of Representatives of the Philippines from Bataan
Mayors of places in Bataan
People from Balanga, Bataan
De La Salle University alumni
Kabalikat ng Malayang Pilipino politicians
National Unity Party (Philippines) politicians
Lakas–CMD politicians